Lighthouse Point is a suburb of Fort Lauderdale located in Broward County, Florida, United States. The suburb was named for the Hillsboro Inlet Lighthouse, which is located in nearby Hillsboro Beach. As of the 2020 census, the population of Lighthouse Point was 10,486. Lighthouse Point is a part of the Miami metropolitan area, home to 	6,166,488 people at the 2020 census.

Geography

Lighthouse Point is located in northeastern Broward County. It is adjacent to the following municipalities:

To its north:
 Deerfield Beach

To its east:
 Hillsboro Beach (across the Intracoastal Waterway)

To its west and south:
 Pompano Beach

Lighthouse Point is known for boating as the vast majority of the city is built on canals built during the 1950s to 1960's. This created a large amount of water front housing and made boating and fishing popular.

Through the Hillsboro Inlet boats can reach the Bahamas within 40 miles to Bimini or 60 miles to Grand Bahama.

Demographics

2020 census

As of the 2020 United States census, there were 10,486 people, 5,188 households, and 3,141 families residing in the city.

2010 census

As of 2010, there were 5,774 households, out of which 15.1% were vacant. In 2000, 19.5% had children under the age of 18 living with them, 50.7% were married couples living together, 6.0% had a female householder with no husband present, and 40.4% were non-families. 33.6% of all households were made up of individuals, and 16.3% had someone living alone who was 65 years of age or older. The average household size was 2.08 and the average family size was 2.65.

2000 census

In 2000, the city the population was spread out, with 16.2% under the age of 18, 3.4% from 18 to 24, 27.1% from 25 to 44, 30.1% from 45 to 64, and 23.2% who were 65 years of age or older. The median age was 47 years. For every 100 females, there were 91.8 males. For every 100 females age 18 and over, there were 89.4 males.

As of 2000, the median income for a household in the city was $53,038, and the median income for a family was $72,418. Males had a median income of $51,897 versus $32,929 for females. The per capita income for the city was $40,839. About 2.6% of families and 5.0% of the population were below the poverty line, including 3.8% of those under age 18 and 6.5% of those age 65 or over.

As of 2000, speakers of English as their first language were 19.18%, while 74.64% spoke Spanish as theirs. Other languages spoken as a first language are Italian 1.93%, French 1.22%, German at 1.06%, and Portuguese at 0.71%.

Media

Lighthouse Point is part of the Miami-Fort Lauderdale-Hollywood media market, which is the twelfth largest radio market and the seventeenth largest television market in the United States. Its primary daily newspapers are the South Florida Sun-Sentinel and The Miami Herald, and their Spanish-language counterparts El Sentinel and El Nuevo Herald.

Each house, apartment and business in Lighthouse Point receives the monthly lifestyle magazine "Lighthouse Point" created and mailed by publishers Susan and Richard Rosser.

Education

Broward County Public Schools serves the community. All residents are zoned to Norcrest Elementary School (Pompano Beach), Deerfield Beach Middle School, and Deerfield Beach High School (located in Deerfield Beach). It is also in the service area of the magnet school Pompano Beach High School.

Originally North Broward Preparatory School was located in the city. It was established there in 1957, but is no longer located in Lighthouse Point.

Lighthouse Point Library 

Mission Statement: The Doreen Gauthier Lighthouse Point Library was established (1965) for the purpose of providing community members of all ages with informational, recreational, cultural, and educational enrichment through access to print materials, digital resources, current technologies, services, programs, and a professional library staff.

The library has a print collection of over 40,000 circulating titles, patron wifi access, public computers, a fax machine, scanning and printing, AWE Kids Learning Stations, Overdrive eBooks and streaming audio-books, access to the Florida Electronic Library and digital research databases, audio books on CD, DVDs, magazines and newspapers, study rooms (by appointment), and exam proctoring (by appointment only).

Notable people

 Paul Castronovo, radio personality
 Ben Klassen, founder of the religion Creativity
 Bruce Nickells, harness racing driver   
 Mike Phipps, College Football Hall of Fame member
 Nevin Shapiro, University of Miami football booster who is currently imprisoned for orchestrating a $930 million Ponzi scheme
 John Spadavecchia, poker player

References

External links
 City of Lighthouse Point official website

Cities in Broward County, Florida
Populated places on the Intracoastal Waterway in Florida
Cities in Florida
1947 establishments in Florida